Arenaria grandiflora subsp. bolosii is a species of plant in the family Caryophyllaceae. It is endemic to Spain. Its natural habitat is Mediterranean-type shrubby vegetation. It is threatened by habitat loss.

References

grandiflora subsp. bolosii
Endemic flora of Spain
Critically endangered plants
Taxonomy articles created by Polbot